Scatter River Old Growth Provincial Park is a provincial park in British Columbia, Canada, located on the Liard River downstream from Liard River Hot Springs Provincial Park and Liard River Corridor Provincial Park and Protected Area.  The park includes the Grand Canyon of the Liard, a 30 km stretch of canyon and whitewater between the Toad and Trout River converges with the Liard.  The park includes high upland plateau and muskeg as well as stands of old growth spruce forests.  Established in 1999, the park is c.1140 ha. in area.

See also
Terminal Range
Sentinel Range (Canada)
Toad River Hot Springs Provincial Park

References

Liard Country
Provincial parks of British Columbia
Canyons and gorges of British Columbia
Protected areas established in 1999
1999 establishments in British Columbia